Ghader Mizbani Iranagh (born 6 September 1975 in Tabriz) is an Iranian former professional road bicycle racer, who rode professionally between 2001 and 2018 for the Telekom Malaysia Cycling Team, the , Brisaspor, the  and the . Mizbani won the overall standings of the UCI Asia Tour twice – in 2005–06 and 2008–09. Mizbani won the Iranian National Road Race Championships three times and the Iranian National Time Trial Championships twice.

Major results

1996
 2nd Overall Tour of Mevlana
1998
 1st  Time trial, Asian Games
1999
 3rd Overall Tour of Azerbaijan
1st Stages 1, 3 & 8
 4th Time trial, Asian Road Championships
 8th Overall Tour of Saudi Arabia
2000
 1st Overall Tour of Azerbaijan
2001
 National Road Championships
1st  Road race
1st  Time trial
 1st Overall Tour of Saudi Arabia
1st Stages 1 & 3 (ITT)
 2nd Overall Presidential Cycling Tour of Turkey
1st Stages 3 & 5
 5th Time trial, Asian Road Championships
2002
 1st Overall Tour of Saudi Arabia
1st Stage 4
 1st  Overall Presidential Cycling Tour of Turkey
1st Stage 3
 1st Overall Tour of Azerbaijan
1st Stages 1 & 6
 4th Overall Tour de Korea
 5th Time trial, Asian Road Championships
 7th Overall Tour de Serbie
1st Stage 4
2003
 1st  Overall Tour de Taiwan
1st Stage 7
 2nd Overall Tour of Qinghai Lake
 2nd Overall Presidential Cycling Tour of Turkey
1st Stage 6
 4th Overall The Paths of King Nikola
 6th Overall Tour of Azerbaijan
 8th Overall Tour de Korea
2004
 1st Stage 4 Tour de Indonesia
 2nd Overall Tour of Qinghai Lake
 3rd  Time trial, Asian Road Championships
 9th Overall Tour of Japan
2005
 1st  Overall Azerbaïjan Tour
1st Stage 2
 2nd Overall Tour de Taiwan
 4th Overall Tour de East Java
1st Stage 4
 5th Overall Kerman Tour
1st Stage 2 (TTT)
 8th Overall Tour of Qinghai Lake
1st Mountains classification
1st Stage 5
 8th Overall Tour de Indonesia
2006
 1st Overall 2005–06 UCI Asia Tour
 National Road Championships
1st  Time trial
2nd Road race
 1st Overall Milad De Nour Tour
1st Stages 2 & 5 (TTT)
 1st Overall Kerman Tour
1st Stage 1
 1st  Overall Presidential Cycling Tour of Turkey
1st Stage 2
 1st  Overall Azerbaïjan Tour
1st Stage 5 (TTT)
 1st  Overall Tour de East Java
1st Mountains classification
1st Stage 4
 Asian Games
2nd  Team time trial
5th Time trial
 Asian Road Championships
2nd  Time trial
2nd  Team time trial
5th Road race
 2nd  Team pursuit, Asian Track Championships
 7th Overall Tour of Qinghai Lake
2007
 National Road Championships
1st  Road race
2nd Time trial
 1st Overall Milad De Nour Tour
1st Stage 5 (ITT)
 1st Stage 4 Tour de Taiwan
 2nd Overall Kerman Tour
1st Prologue
 2nd Overall Azerbaïjan Tour
1st Stage 4
 5th Overall Tour of Siam
1st Stage 4
 5th Overall Presidential Cycling Tour of Turkey
 6th Overall Tour de Langkawi
 9th Overall Tour de East Java
2008
 1st Overall Tour de Indonesia
1st Stages 5 & 10
 1st  Overall Tour de East Java
1st Stage 4
 1st Overall Kerman Tour
1st Stage 2 (TTT)
 2nd Overall Azerbaïjan Tour
1st Prologue, Stages 2 (TTT) & 3
 2nd Overall Jelajah Malaysia
 4th Overall President Tour of Iran
1st Stage 5
 7th Overall Tour of Qinghai Lake
2009
 1st  Overall Tour de Singkarak
1st Stage 3a
 1st  Overall President Tour of Iran
1st Stage 3
 2nd Overall Tour of Qinghai Lake
1st Stages 3 & 8
 2nd Overall Tour de Indonesia
1st Stages 1 (TTT) & 4
 2nd Overall Tour de East Java
 3rd Overall Jelajah Malaysia
 3rd Overall Azerbaïjan Tour
1st Stage 5
 6th Overall Circuito Montañés
2010
 1st  Overall Azerbaïjan Tour
1st Stages 1, 5 & 6
 1st  Overall Tour de Singkarak
1st Stages 1 (TTT) & 3
 3rd Time trial, National Road Championships
 7th Road race, Asian Road Championships
 7th Overall Tour of Qinghai Lake
1st Stage 3
 9th Overall Tour de Langkawi
 9th Overall Presidential Tour of Iran
2011
 1st Overall Milad De Nour Tour
1st Stage 1
 3rd Overall Azerbaïjan Tour
1st Stage 3 (TTT)
 3rd Overall International Presidency Tour of Iran
 5th Overall Tour de Korea
 10th Overall Tour de Langkawi
2012
 7th Overall Tour de Langkawi
2013
 1st  Road race, National Road Championships
 1st  Overall Tour de Filipinas
1st  Points classification
1st Stage 4
 1st Overall Tour of Iran
1st Mountains classification
1st Stage 5
 1st  Overall Tour de Singkarak
 1st  Overall Tour of Borneo
1st  Mountains classification
1st  Asian rider classification
1st Stage 4
 6th Overall Tour of Qinghai Lake
 7th Overall Tour de Ijen
2014
 1st  Overall Tour of Iran
1st Stage 5
 1st  Overall Tour de East Java
1st  Mountains classification
1st Stage 2
 1st  Mountains classification Tour of Qinghai Lake
 3rd Overall Tour of Japan
1st Stage 5
 3rd Overall Tour of Fuzhou
 7th Overall Tour de Ijen
2015
 4th Overall Tour of Iran
 8th Overall Tour de Singkarak
 9th Overall Tour of Japan
2016
 6th Overall Tour of Iran
1st Stage 5
 6th Overall Tour of Japan
 7th Road race, Asian Road Championships
 9th Overall Tour of Qinghai Lake
 10th Overall Tour of Fuzhou

External links

1975 births
Living people
Iranian male cyclists
Iranian track cyclists
Cyclists at the 2008 Summer Olympics
Cyclists at the 2016 Summer Olympics
Olympic cyclists of Iran
Sportspeople from Tabriz
Asian Games gold medalists for Iran
Asian Games silver medalists for Iran
Presidential Cycling Tour of Turkey winners
Asian Games medalists in cycling
Cyclists at the 1994 Asian Games
Cyclists at the 1998 Asian Games
Cyclists at the 2002 Asian Games
Cyclists at the 2006 Asian Games
Tour of Azerbaijan (Iran) winners
Medalists at the 1998 Asian Games
Medalists at the 2006 Asian Games
21st-century Iranian people